Cyperus planifolius, commonly known as flatleaf flatsedge, is a species of sedge that is native to southern parts of North America, Central America, the Caribbean, and northern parts of South America.

See also
List of Cyperus species

References

planifolius
Plants described in 1792
Flora of Cuba
Flora of Mexico
Flora of the Bahamas
Flora of Belize
Flora of Bermuda
Flora of Brazil
Flora of the Cayman Islands
Flora of Colombia
Flora of the Dominican Republic
Flora of Florida
Flora of Georgia (U.S. state)
Flora of Haiti
Flora of Honduras
Flora of Jamaica
Flora of Puerto Rico
Flora of Trinidad
Flora of Venezuela
Taxa named by Louis Claude Richard
Flora without expected TNC conservation status